Highlight or Highlights may refer to:

Generic use
Specular highlight, a spot of light that appears on shiny objects when illuminated by a direct light source
 Hair highlighting, lightening and/or coloring part of someone's hair

Music
 Highlight (band), a South Korean boy group
Highlights (band), a Swedish dansband

Albums
Highlight (album), the third Korean studio album by Beast
Highlights (Tom Hingley and the Lovers album), 2008
Highlights (Tanlines album), 2015
The Highlights, a 2021 greatest hits album by the Weeknd

Songs
"Highlight" the theme song for Super Drags, by Pabllo Vittar
title track "Highlight", South Korean boy group Beast Highlight (album)
Highlight, a song by South Korean-Japanese girl group Iz One from their 2019 EP Heart*Iz
 "Highlights", a 1998 song by Backyard Babies from Total 13
"Highlights" (song), a 2016 song by Kanye West
Highlights for Children a.k.a. Highlights: Fun with a Purpose, a US-published children's magazine

In technology 

 Highlighter, a marker pen that adds translucent color to paper, to emphasize particular parts of the text
 In computing, the selection of on-screen text such as preparing for a cut, copy, and paste operation
 Highlight (application), a social networking application
 Highlight (photography), the brightest areas in an image
 Syntax highlighting, the display of text in different colors and/or fonts, depending upon its meaning in context

Other uses
 Highlights, a public page on the Russian social networking site VKontakte 
 Highlights FC, Nevisian association football club
 In sports, a collection of top plays, often featuring a particular player, team, or position